John McCashney may refer to:

John McCashney (footballer, born 1884) (1884–1952), Australian rules footballer with South Melbourne
John McCashney (footballer, born 1932), Australian rules footballer with Hawthorn